The 1990–91 Eliteserien season was the 52nd season of ice hockey in Norway. Eight teams participated in the league, and Valerenga Ishockey won the championship.

Regular season

Playoffs

External links 
 Norwegian Ice Hockey Federation

Nor
1990-91
GET